Kungsberga is a locality situated on the Lake Mälaren island of Färingsö, Ekerö Municipality, Stockholm County, Sweden, with 406 inhabitants in 2010.

References 

Populated places in Ekerö Municipality
Uppland